Sisay Meseret Gola (born 30 December 1997) is an Ethiopian long-distance runner. In 2020, she competed in the women's half marathon at the 2020 World Athletics Half Marathon Championships held in Gdynia, Poland.

References

External links 
 

Living people
1997 births
Place of birth missing (living people)
Ethiopian female long-distance runners
20th-century Ethiopian women
21st-century Ethiopian women